was the son of the daimyō Torii Tadamasa; his fief reverted to the control of the shogunate when Tadatsune died without an heir. 

Daimyo
1636 deaths
Torii clan
1604 births